Aleksei I. Goloborodko (pronounced: Al-ix-EY Ga-la-ba-RROJ-ka, born 1994) is a Russian contortionist. In addition to contortion, he has trained in classical and modern dance and Chinese martial arts. He has performed in a variety of arts festivals and competitions, television programs, circuses, and shows. He is currently in the Cirque du Soleil show Luzia.

Early life
Alexey was born in Tula, Russia.

Alexey's mother said that his natural flexibility sometimes scared people. He was then spotted by his coach-to-be, Vladislav Afanasievich Rodin, in the Circus Circle in Tula.

Previously, Vladislav trained his son for 30 years. Vlasislav said that trainings are a synthesis of classical dance, gymnastics, rhythmic gymnastics, modern dance, martial arts and extreme flexibility of the body. Years later, after the son had moved abroad, he met a promising young boy in the Circus Circle. He provided free of charge individual training for this boy - Vladimir Gagarin - who in his turn developed into an award-winning contortionist. However, for personal and family reasons, Gagarin left the scene in his teens. The coach was saddened by this situation and disinclined to take on new trainees.

When he met Alexey he was won over by his enthusiasm and determination, and changed his mind. A room in the Goloborodko family's flat was converted into a gymnasium for Alexey, and he trained for several hours each day, not only with Rodin, but also with specialist dance instructors. Natalia Perepelkina (leading teacher of the Tula branch of the Moscow Institute of Culture) - taught classical dance. The famous dancer Svetlana Shishkina taught modern dance, while Maria Nikolaeva taught "Jazz Style" dance. Wushu graduate Shaolin Igor Kovalenko instructed him in various Chinese martial arts, "wushu" being another term for referring to these arts. This team trained him in seven distinct performances, called "The Swan", "Tango," "Petrushka", "Rock," "Mowgli", "God of the Sun" and "Obsession." 
 Alexey has recently stated that his repertoire now stands at ten different acts.

Career

Festivals and awards
He has participated in many circus and arts festivals and competitions.  Details of some of them are available, and these are listed below. Rodin has stated that Alexey won medals at ten such competitions in the period 2004 - 2007.
Winner of first prize for his contortion performance at a Circus Festival in Russia in 2003 
 Bronze medalist at the international children's circus competition in Monte Carlo, Dec 2007 
Medal winner at the Moscow Youth Festival of Circus Arts
Medal winner at the Circus Festival in the city of Ivanovo
Winner at the Festival of arts and sports Golden Lily Kiev, 27 Oct 2007 
Special Jury Prize - "Dancing Rubber" Sixth Moscow International Youth Festival of Circus Arts  2007  
Winner of a gold medal at the VII Youth Delphic Games of Russia, Novosibirsk, May 2008. Absolute winner in the "Circus" category 
Third place - Second World Delphic Games Saratov, Russia.  Circus - Age group 10–30, 19–25 September 2008
Silver Medal at 8th China Wuhan International Acrobatics Art Festival, Hubei Province, China, 26 Oct 2008
Youngest participant in the III Festival of Circus and Arts, Ishevsk, Russia, March 2010

Television appearances
A documentary program about him was made for Russian television channel REN-TV, in 2003, when he was aged nine.

In late 2007 Alexey took part in the very popular and influential TV talent competition:- Минута Славы, or Minuta Slavy - "A Minute Of Fame". It's the Russian show from the "Got Talent" franchise. This was the event that made him a household name throughout his country, and brought him to the attention of many abroad as well.

In the first round he performed a ballet and contortion routine: The Swan. The musical accompaniment was Ave Maria by Charles Gounod, played on wine glasses, crystal xylophone and bass guitar by the St. Petersburg trio Crystal Harmony. There was a very enthusiastic response from the audience, and he won easily.

In the second round the act was: Sun God, based on a classical Indian dance. Alexey's elaborate costume was designed to look as though it was made from gold and jewels. The music was a recorded version of Recuerdos de la Alhambra by Francisco Tárrega. Again there was an ecstatic response from the audience, and again he won the round.

In the third round Alexey performed Obsession, his trademark contortion act using two folding chairs. The audience loved it, the judges apparently did not, and the eventual winner of the competition was Dmitry Bulkin, with his acrobatic performance on a vertical pole. There was a complaint by Rodin that Bulkin had misled the organizers of the competition, by claiming to be an amateur, and a car mechanic by trade, when he had actually performed in the Cirque du Soleil, and other prestigious circuses.

In February 2010 he took part in the Channel TF1 French TV Talent Show Qui Sera le Meilleur ce Soir? He won the first round, a one on one competition with twelve-year-old Swiss contortionist Zoé Pauli-Bruttin. In the final, however, the judges opined that he came across as a professional intruding into a contest for amateurs, and he lost to Loan and Emeryck, two much younger children with a dance act. Thus he was the accuser last time, the accused this time.

Live performances
Alexey has become a regular performer at the circus, having worked at Circo Massimo, Rome, in July 2008, Circus Sarasota, Florida, in Feb/March 2009, and Circus Conelli, Zurich, in November 2009. He has also performed on board a cruise ship SuperStar Virgo, operating in South-East Asia, in June–August 2009.

From June 2010 to June 2011 he appeared as "The Game Master... a friendly and mischievous sprite" in "Voyage de la Vie" at Resorts World Sentosa in Singapore. This production, billed as a "circus theatre spectacular", tells the story of a boy's coming of age, through song and dance and circus arts.

During November and December 2011 he appeared in a variety show at the GoEasy Charisma Cabaret Lounge in Würenlingen, Switzerland.

In April 2016 he joined the world-renowned circus company Cirque du Soleil, performing contortion with their touring show Luzia.

References

External links
Alexey performing

Living people
1994 births
People from Tula, Russia
Contortionists